Blackburn Corporation Tramways operated a tramway service in Blackburn, Lancashire, England between 1887 and 1949.

History

Blackburn Corporation Tramways Company was established in 1886 by Cosh & Cramp, a partnership of a London-based tramway contractor and engineer, Charles Courtney Cramp and Richard Lawrence Cosh.

Blackburn Corporation operated a tramway from 28 May 1887. There were two routes operated by steam power, and two by horse-drawn trams. Fourteen steam engines were obtained from Thomas Green & Son at a cost of £700 (equivalent to £ in )  each.

In 1888, Robert Walter Cramp, brother of Charles Courtney Cramp, was appointed manager.

On 24 August 1898, Blackburn Corporation purchased the Company for £77,210 (equivalent to £ in ), and undertook a programme of modernisation and electrification. The power station was at the junction of Bridge Street, and Jubilee Street.

The company acquired 48 tramcars from G.F. Milnes & Co. and 12 from United Electric Car Company which were decorated in an olive green and ivory livery.

The company had a through running arrangement with the cars of the Darwen Corporation Tramways system.

Closure

The last service ran on 3 September 1949.

References

Tram transport in England
Transport in Blackburn with Darwen
History of Blackburn with Darwen
Historic transport in Lancashire